Mantrap Lake is a lake in Hubbard County, in the U.S. state of Minnesota.

Mantrap Lake was so named because it was known by the pioneers to be difficult to travel around it.

See also
List of lakes in Minnesota

References

Lakes of Minnesota
Lakes of Hubbard County, Minnesota